This is the complete list of Asian Games medalists in taekwondo from 1986 to 2018.

Poomsae

Men's individual

Men's team

Women's individual

Women's team

Men's kyorugi

Finweight
 −50 kg: 1986–1998
 −54 kg: 2002–2014

Flyweight
 −54 kg: 1986–1998
 −58 kg: 2002–

Bantamweight
 −58 kg: 1986–1998
 −62 kg: 2002–2006
 −63 kg: 2010–

Featherweight
 −64 kg: 1986–1998
 −67 kg: 2002–2006
 −68 kg: 2010–

Lightweight
 −70 kg: 1986–1998
 −72 kg: 2002–2006
 −74 kg: 2010–2014

Welterweight
 −76 kg: 1986–1998
 −78 kg: 2002–2006
 −80 kg: 2010–

Middleweight
 −83 kg: 1986–1998
 −84 kg: 2002–2006
 −87 kg: 2010–2014

Heavyweight
 +83 kg: 1986–1998
 +84 kg: 2002–2006
 +87 kg: 2010–2014
 +80 kg: 2018–

Women's kyorugi

Finweight
 −43 kg: 1998
 −47 kg: 2002–2006
 −46 kg: 2010–2014

Flyweight
 −47 kg: 1998
 −51 kg: 2002–2006
 −49 kg: 2010–

Bantamweight
 −51 kg: 1998
 −55 kg: 2002–2006
 −53 kg: 2010–

Featherweight
 −55 kg: 1998
 −59 kg: 2002–2006
 −57 kg: 2010–

Lightweight
 −60 kg: 1998
 −63 kg: 2002–2006
 −62 kg: 2010–2014

Welterweight
 −65 kg: 1998
 −67 kg: 2002–

Middleweight
 −70 kg: 1998
 −72 kg: 2002–2006
 −73 kg: 2010–2014

Heavyweight
 +70 kg: 1998
 +72 kg: 2002–2006
 +73 kg: 2010–2014
 +67 kg: 2018–

References
Medallists from previous Asian Games – Taekwondo

External links
Asian Taekwondo Federation

Taekwondo
medalists